, better known by her ring name , is a Japanese professional wrestler currently signed to World Wonder Ring Stardom and briefly working as a freelancer. She is best known for her time with Stardom, where she is a former Artist of Stardom Champion and Future of Stardom Champion.

Professional wrestling career

Independent circuit (2019–present)
Sayaka wrestled for DDT Pro-Wrestling in the DDT Peter Pan series of events, making her first appearance at Wrestle Peter Pan 2019 on July 15, where she teamed up with Natsumi Maki and Yuna Manase in a losing effort to Rika Tatsumi and The Bakuretsu Sisters (Nodoka Tenma and Yuki Aino).

Tokyo Joshi Pro Wrestling (2019–2020)
Sayaka made her professional wrestling debut under the name Himawari Unagi on January 4 at the TJP Tokyo Joshi Pro '19 show by teaming up with Saki Akai to face the team of Yumi and Yuki Kamifuku. During her tenure with Tokyo Joshi Pro Wrestling she fought as a singles wrestler and competed against other well-known wrestlers such as Yuka Sakazaki at TJP Pinano Pipipipi Graduation Special on April 5, 2019, Maki Itoh at TJPW Tokyo Princess Cup on August 8, 2020, or Miyu Yamashita.

World Wonder Ring Stardom (2020–present)
Sayaka debuted in World Wonder Ring Stardom on November 14, 2020, at the Korakuen New Landscape Event teaming up with Tam Nakano and Mina Shirakawa, as the newest member of Cosmic Angels, defeating Stars (Gokigen Death, Mayu Iwatani and Starlight Kid). She began her with her tenure with Stardom as a tag team wrestler, and worked against different stables such as Donna Del Mondo (Himeka, Maika and Natsupoi) and Queen's Quest (Momo Watanabe and Saya Kamitani). On December 16, at Road To Osaka Dream Cinderella, Cosmic Angels defeated Oedo Tai (Bea Priestley, Natsuko Tora and Saki Kashima), to win Sayaka's first title of her career, the Artist of Stardom Championship. At Stardom Osaka Dream Cinderella 2020 on December 20, they scored their successful title defense against Stars (Gokigen Death, Mayu Iwatani and Starlight Kid).

At Stardom 10th Anniversary Show on January 17, 2021, Sayaka unsuccessfully challenged Saya Iida for the Future of Stardom Championship. On March 3, 2021, at All Star Dream Cinderella, Sayaka won a 24-person All-Star rumble featuring wrestlers from the promotion's past, such as Yuzuki Aikawa and Chigusa Nagayo, Yoko Bito and Kyoko Inoue. At Stardom Yokohama Dream Cinderella 2021 on April 4, Sayaka fell short to Saya Kamitani in a singles match. On the first night of the Stardom Cinderella Tournament 2021 from April 10, she defeated Natsuko Tora in a Cinderella Tournament First-round match. In the Stardom 5 Star Grand Prix 2021 she fought in the Block B and scored a total of nine points after competing against Syuri, Saya Kamitani, Takumi Iroha, Konami, Utami Hayashishita, Tam Nakano, Maika, AZM and Ruaka. At Stardom 10th Anniversary Grand Final Osaka Dream Cinderella on October 9, 2021, she dropped the Future of Stardom Championship to Ruaka. Sayaka participated in the Stardom Super Wars trilogy of events, making her first appearance on November 3, 2021, at Kawasaki Super Wars where she unsuccessfully challenged stablemate Tam Nakano for the Wonder of Stardom Championship. At Tokyo Super Wars on November 27, she teamed up with Lady C in a losing effort against AZM and Momo Watanabe. At Osaka Super Wars, the last event of the trilogy which took place on December 18, Sayaka teamed up with Mina Shirakawa and Tam Nakano in a losing effort against Mayu Iwatani, Hazuki and Koguma in a Six-woman tag team match as part of a ¥10 Million Unit tournament. At Stardom Dream Queendom on December 29, 2021, Sayaka teamed up with Mai Sakurai and Mina Shirakawa to unsuccessfully challenge MaiHimePoi (Maika, Natsupoi and Himeka) for the Artist of Stardom Championship.

At Stardom Nagoya Supreme Fight on January 29, 2022, Sayaka unsuccessfully challenged Saya Kamitani for the Wonder of Stardom Championship. At Stardom Cinderella Journey on February 23, 2020, Sayaka teamed up with Mina Shirakawa to unsuccessfully challenge FWC (Hazuki and Koguma) for the Goddess of Stardom Championship. At Stardom New Blood 1 on March 11, 2022, she teamed up with Waka Tsukiyama in a losing effort against Marvelous (Maria and Ai Houzan). On the first night of the Stardom World Climax 2022 from March 26, Sayaka teamed up with Tam Nakano to unsuccessfully face Mayu Iwatani and a returning Kairi. On the second night from March 27, she participated in a 18-women Cinderella Rumble match won by Mei Suruga and also involving various wrestlers from other pronotions such as Tomoka Inaba, Aoi, Haruka Umesaki, Nanami, Yuna Mizumori and others from Stardom. Sayaka made it to the second rounds in the Stardom Cinderella Tournament 2022 where she was defeated by Natsupoi on April 10. At Stardom Golden Week Fight Tour on May 5, 2022, Sayaka teamed up with Tam Nakano and Mina Shirakawa to defeat Queen's Quest's Utami Hayashishita, AZM & Lady C. At Stardom New Blood 2 on May 13, 2022, she teamed up with Mina Shirakawa and Haruka Umesaki to defeat YoungOED (Starlight Kid, Ruaka and Rina). At Stardom Flashing Champions on May 28, 2022, Sayaka teamed up with Mina Shirakawa and Waka Tsukiyama, falling short to Prominence (Suzu Suzuki, Akane Fujita and Mochi Natsumi). At Stardom Fight in the Top on June 26, 2022, she fought in a three-way match won by Ruaka and also involving Lady C. At Stardom New Blood 3 on July 8, 2022, she teamed up with Mina Shirakawa, Yuko Sakurai and Rina Amikura in a losing effort against Oedo Tai (Starlight Kid, Ruaka & Rina) and Haruka Umesaki. At Mid Summer Champions in Tokyo, the first event of the Stardom Mid Summer Champions series which took place on July 9, 2022, she teamed up with Tam Nakano, Mina Shirakawa, Saki and Hikari Shimizu to defeat Donna Del Mondo (Giulia, Maika, Himeka, Natsupoi and Mai Sakurai). At Mid Summer Champions in Nagoya on July 24, she teamed up again with Shirakawa and Shimizu, this time in a three-way match won by Prominence (Risa Sera, Hiragi Kurumi and Suzu Suzuki), and also involving Queen's Quest (Lady C, Hina and Miyu Amasaki). At Stardom in Showcase vol.1 on July 23, 2022, Sayaka competed in a comedic Cosmic rules three-way match in which she battled Saki and Mina Shirakawa into a no-contest. At Stardom in Showcase vol.2 on September 25, 2022, she competed in another match of its kind, this time by teaming up with Shirakawa against Saki and Hikari Shimizu, and Tam Nakano and Natsupoi. The match result was again a no contest. At Stardom x Stardom: Nagoya Midsummer Encounter on August 21, 2022, she teamed up with Saki an Shirakawa to unsuccessfully challenge Momo Watanabe, Starlight Kid and Saki Kashima for the Artist of Stardom Championship. At the Stardom 5 Star Grand Prix 2022, Sayaka fought in the "Red Stars" block, scoring only four points after competing against Tam Nakao, Himeka, Maika, Risa Sera, AZM, Utami Hayashishita, Koguma, Syuri, Saki Kashima, Saki, Mai Sakura and Momo Kohgo. Unagi Sayaka announced on October 4, 2022, that she has become a temporal free agent. However, Sayaka stated that she would remain a member of Cosmic Angels. It was reported that Sayaka was however still signwed to the company as she was only on an unpaid hiatus. She returned for a one night only show, the Stardom in Showcase vol.3 from November 26, 2022 where she teamed up with Tam Nakano and Natsupoi in a losing effort against Prominence (Hiragi Kurumi, Risa Sera and Suzu Suzuki) as a result of a Six-Woman Hardcore Tag Team Match.

Freelancing (2022-present)
After taking a break from Stardom to start a Freelance period, Sayaka began wandering the Japanese independent circuit. She made her debut in Professional Wrestling Just Tap Out on October 7, 2022, where she defeated Aoi. She implied herself into a storyline with Tomoka Inaba as she challenged the latter for the Queen of JTO Championship. Sayaka competed for Marvelous That's Women Pro Wrestling's vacant AAAW Single Championship in a tournament on December 4, 2022 also involving Tomoko Watanabe, Rin Kadokura, Mio Momono, Ai Houzan, Queen Aminata, Maria, Riko Kawahata, Chikayo Nagashima and Yuna Manase. She came out unsuccessfully in the process.

Championships and accomplishments
 Pro Wrestling Illustrated
 Ranked No. 147 of the top 150 female singles wrestlers in the PWI Women's 150 in 2021
World Wonder Ring Stardom
Artist of Stardom Championship (1 time) – with Tam Nakano and Mina Shirakawa
Future of Stardom Championship (1 time)
Stardom Year-End Award (1 time)
Fighting Spirit Award (2021)

References 

1989 births
Living people
Japanese female professional wrestlers
People from Osaka Prefecture
Sportspeople from Osaka
21st-century professional wrestlers
Artist of Stardom Champions
Future of Stardom Champions